Elise Egseth (born 12 May 1985) is a Norwegian orienteering competitor and junior world champion.

Junior career
Egseth won a gold medal in the relay at the 2005 Junior World Orienteering Championships in Tenero, together with Mari Fasting and Betty Ann Bjerkreim Nilsen. She also received a silver medal in the long course in 2005, and a bronze medal in the relay in 2004.

Senior career
Egseth participated in the Orienteering World Cup in 2007, finishing 38th overall.
At the European Orienteering Championships in Ventspils 2008 she finished 15th in the sprint distance.

References

External links
 
 

1985 births
Living people
Norwegian orienteers
Female orienteers
Foot orienteers
World Orienteering Championships medalists
World Games bronze medalists
Competitors at the 2009 World Games
World Games medalists in orienteering
Junior World Orienteering Championships medalists